The 1951 U.S. National Championships (now known as the US Open) was a tennis tournament that took place on the outdoor grass courts at the West Side Tennis Club, Forest Hills in New York City, United States. The tournament ran from 25 August until 5 September. It was the 71st staging of the U.S. National Championships, and the fourth Grand Slam tennis event of the year.

Finals

Men's singles

 Frank Sedgman defeated  Vic Seixas  6–4, 6–1, 6–1

Women's singles

 Maureen Connolly defeated  Shirley Fry  6–3, 1–6, 6–4

Men's doubles
 Ken McGregor /  Frank Sedgman defeated  Don Candy /  Mervyn Rose 10–8, 6–4, 4–6, 7–5

Women's doubles
 Shirley Fry /  Doris Hart defeated  Nancy Chaffee /  Patricia Todd 6–4, 6–2

Mixed doubles
 Doris Hart /   Frank Sedgman defeated  Shirley Fry /  Mervyn Rose 6–3, 6–2

References

External links
Official US Open website

 
U.S. National Championships
U.S. National Championships (tennis) by year
U.S. National Championships
U.S. National Championships
U.S. National Championships
U.S. National Championships